Richard Emanuel Klugman (18 January 1924 – 21 February 2011) was an Australian doctor, activist and politician. He was a member of the Australian Labor Party (ALP) and served in the House of Representatives from 1969 to 1990, representing the New South Wales seat of Prospect.

Early life
Klugman was born in Vienna on 18 January 1924, the son of Ella and Bernard Klugman. His father was a Jewish businessman and the family left the country in 1938 to escape antisemitism. He attended Hurlstone Agricultural High School and the University of Sydney, where he studied science and medicine. He worked part-time as a builder's labourer and clerk while at university. He was the president of the Sydney University Labor Club and the Australian Student Labor Federation. In 1947 he was charged with using indecent language, assaulting a policeman, and resisting arrest in relation with a demonstration outside the Dutch consulate during the Indonesian War of Independence. He pleaded not guilty and alleged that he was a victim of police brutality.

After graduating, Klugman practised as a doctor in  the Sydney suburbs of Guildford and Villawood. He was an honorary officer at Liverpool Hospital, Parramatta Hospital and Royal North Shore Hospital.

Politics and activism
In 1969, Klugman was elected to the Australian House of Representatives as the Labor member for the new seat of Prospect, a western-Sydney constituency.  Klugman held the seat of Prospect until his retirement in 1990. During his time as a Member of Parliament he did not hold any ministerial offices. A firm anti-communist, he was one of the few federal parliamentarians who in 1976 boycotted the House of Representatives' tributes to the recently deceased Chairman Mao.

Personal life
Klugman married Karin Joseph in 1953, with whom he had one daughter. He re-married in 1964 to Kristine Barnard, with whom he had another three daughters. Their daughter Jeni was the first female Rhodes Scholar from New South Wales. His third marriage was to Margaret Healy.

Klugman died in Sydney on 21 February 2011.

References

Australian Labor Party members of the Parliament of Australia
Members of the Australian House of Representatives for Prospect
Members of the Australian House of Representatives
Jewish emigrants from Austria to Australia after the Anschluss
1924 births
2011 deaths
20th-century Australian politicians